The “Organic Market Development in Ukraine 2012 – 2016, Phase II” project is implemented by the Swiss Research Institute of Organic Agriculture (FiBL) and foster the growth of small and medium enterprises in the Ukrainian organic food sector by developing organic and regional food supply chains.

The project is funded by the Swiss Confederation through the State Secretariat for Economic Affairs (SECO) and is being implemented by the Swiss Research Institute of Organic Agriculture (FiBL) in cooperation with sector stakeholders in Ukraine and the Ukrainian Ministry of Agricultural Policy and Food.

About the project 

The goal of the Organic Market Development in Ukraine 2012 – 2016, Phase II Project is to foster the growth of small and medium enterprises in the Ukrainian organic food sector by developing organic and regional food supply chains. The focus will be on both national and international markets and the approach is demand driven.

The project aims to strengthen the competitiveness of the country's organic sector by:
 Increasing the quality and volume of selected organic arable crops from small and medium-sized farms for export;
 increasing the quality and volume of organic dairy products from small and medium-sized farms for the domestic market;
 developing a trademark for regional food products from the Carpathians;
 improving commercial organic services;
 fostering a conducive environment for the further development of the organic sector.
The FiBL project team is based in offices in Switzerland (Frick) and Ukraine (Kyiv).

The project leader has the overall responsibility for project implementation and is based in Switzerland. He is in continuous contact with the project manager, who leads the FiBL office in Kyiv. The project manager supervises and coordinates the activities in Ukraine.

A sector expert, with longstanding relevant experience, is assigned to each of the five project components. For the arable crops, dairy and Carpathian trademark components, a local facilitator, based in Ukraine, is employed. The sector expert and the facilitator work closely together.

The project also employs a PR manager who works closely with the facilitators and project manager and is responsible for the promotion, upscaling and dissemination of the project's achievements.

History 
The Organic Market Development in Ukraine 2012–2016, Phase II Project is the follow up to an earlier SECO project: Organic Agriculture Certification and Market Development 2005–2011, Phase I.
The aim of Phase I was to contribute to the growth of the Ukrainian organic sector and its integration within the world trade system.  By giving small and medium-size farmers and other stakeholders in the organic value chain equitable access to new market opportunities it aimed to alleviate poverty – especially in rural areas – where poverty is widespread. Phase I consisted of three components: certification services, market development and policy dialogue and has contributed to the growth of the Ukrainian organic sector. The number of organic operators has increased from 72 in 2005 to 190 in 2012 (Source: Organic Federation of Ukraine and Organic Standard Ltd.) with an additional 40,000 ha of land being certified in this period. The same source estimates that Ukraine now (2012) has 278,800 ha of certified organic land. New market opportunities have been created on the export and domestic markets and premium prices of up to 20-25% (export market) and 40% (domestic market) are being achieved.
An external evaluation (April 2011) confirmed the positive contribution that Phase I has made to promoting the sustainable growth of the organic sector in Ukraine.

Project components

Arable crops 
The objective of the arable crops component is to increase the quality and volume of selected organic arable crops produced by small and medium-sized enterprises (SMEs) for export.
The project is supporting the development of certified organic arable crop value chains, by involving 2-3 strong key actors (leaders) to act as market openers. The project will prioritise a few, promising, organic arable crops. The approach will foster close partnerships between international traders and Ukrainian partners in order to develop reliable trade relationships.
The project aims to strengthen the capacity and level of collaboration among actors involved in the value chains for the selected certified organic arable crops. It is working with the leaders’ agronomists and consultants and other value chain actors to stimulate overall business development. Knowledge transfer from leaders to other actors is done through field visits, field days, workshops, study tours and specific training sessions.

Dairy produce 
The objective of the dairy component is to increase the quality and volume of organic dairy products from small and medium-sized enterprises (SMEs) for the domestic market.
Project support is geared towards developing certified organic dairy value chains, by involving 2-3 strong key actors (leaders) in the dairy sector value chain. The project supports dairy businesses that are based on low-input production systems.

The project aims to strengthen the capacity and skills of leaders, mainly through providing training to their agronomists, veterinary and animal husbandry specialists, as well as to other important actors in the value chain. The capacity building activities involve close cooperation between international experts, national experts and local service providers.
The knowledge of leaders is being shared among other actors in the value chain through shared capacity building events, such as field visits, field days, workshops, etc. Trade shows, conferences, business talks, etc. are being supported by the project to develop a network among the value chain actors and supported entities and to give them insights into the potential development trajectories for their businesses and the sector as a whole.

The ’Taste of the Ukrainian Carpathians’ Trademark 
The objective of this component of the project is to successfully establish a trademark with the name ‘Taste of the Ukrainian Carpathians’ to promote regional food products from the Ukrainian Carpathians. The aim is to develop a labelling system and carry out complementary promotion and support activities in order to benefit food producers and processors from the region and the wider economy.
An Association (Public Union) called 'Carpathian Taste' was registered with the Kolomyia District and City Registration Service (part of the Department of Justice of the Ivano-Frankivsk Region) on November 18, 2013. The Association owns the ‘Taste of the Ukrainian Carpathians’ trademark, which was registered as an Individual Mark of Goods and Services on April 10, 2014, by the State Intellectual Property Service of Ukraine.
This trademark will serve as an umbrella brand and can be used by producers and processors who are members of the Association. Products sold under this label will originate from the Ukrainian Carpathians (the oblasts of Chernivtsi, Ivano-Frankivsk, Lviv, and Zarkarpattia) and will conform to certain quality requirements that have been defined by technical standards.

Strengthening local service providers 
This component of the project aims to strengthen the capacities of key service providers in order to enhance the overall quality and quantity of commercial services available to the organic sector.
The assistance provided by the project aims to ensure the availability of services needed for the sustainable development of the organic market and of a portfolio of services that will allow consultants and experts within the organic sector to become commercially viable by the end of Phase II. The project focuses on service providers in the fields of quality management, market and information services and organic inspection and certification.
Local service providers working in the field of quality improvement and quality assurance of arable crops and dairy products are being trained by means of specific, demand-oriented and practical training courses and seminars. These courses include training in improving crop quality parameters (such as gluten and moisture content, etc.), post-harvest handling (including the avoidance of insects and pests during storage and the prevention of GM contamination) and awareness raising. The project also fosters networking between local service providers and provides them with technical backstopping.
The project is providing support for the market services needed to ensure the sustainable development of the organic market. These market services will make an important contribution towards the development of the organic market and will also provide business opportunities for service providers.

Creating a conducive business environment 
The objective of this component of the project is to create a business and policy environment that is conducive for organic trade.  It is doing so through a bottom-up approach focused on regions (oblasts) with a vested interest in organic farming. Nine oblasts were shortlisted as potential pilot areas. We held capacity building workshops in each one on developing the organic sector and bilateral strategic working meetings with regional policy makers, where organic Ukrainian law and the potential for state support for the growth of the organic sector were discussed. The meetings also promoted extensive networking among organic stakeholders in these regions. On the basis of these workshops, 4 pilot regions (Lviv, Odesa, Zhytomyr, and Poltava) were selected for further work.
We anticipate that this bottom-up approach will generate policy dialogues at the national level and facilitate the development of the organic sector within these oblasts. This work is being supplemented by organising national events to increase awareness about the benefits of organic agriculture and food and by providing support to the National Organic Stakeholder Working Group. The aim is to create a national platform for discussions on the sector's development, which will continue after the project is finished.

This component also has a second line of intervention. This involves increasing awareness about the benefits of organic farming through disseminating information and knowledge among organic stakeholders and the public at large, in order to stimulate demand and improve cohesion within the sector. One of the main factors hindering the development of organic agriculture in Ukraine is a lack of public awareness. This bottleneck is being addressed through intensive and close contact with the media and ‘information multipliers’

Beneficiaries 
Direct beneficiaries of the Organic Market Development in Ukraine 2012–2016, Phase II Project are small and medium-sized enterprises (SMEs) in organic arable crop and dairy value chains and from the Carpathian region. These include farmers, processors, traders, retailers, exporters and service providers. In addition policy makers at the provincial (oblast) and national level in Ukraine will also benefit from the project.
The indirect beneficiaries are consumers, who will benefit from a wider range of available certified organic products.

References

External links 
 Swiss-Ukrainian project "Organic market Development in Ukraine" (2012-2016)
 Research Institute of Organic Agriculture (FiBL)
 State Secretariat for Economic Affairs SECO

Switzerland–Ukraine relations
Organic farming in Europe
Agriculture in Ukraine